Darius, King of Persia is a 1688 tragedy by the English writer John Crowne. It portrays the reign of Darius III of Persian Empire, focusing on his defeat by Alexander the Great and subsequent death.

It was performed by the United Company at the Theatre Royal, Drury Lane in late April before being succeeded by the hit The Squire of Alsatia. The roles played by the various actors are unknown, apart from Elizabeth Barry who appeared as Barzana and also spoke the epilogue. It was noted for the attendance on the play's third night by James II, who later the same year was overthrown in the Glorious Revolution.

References

Bibliography
 Van Lennep, W. The London Stage, 1660-1800: Volume One, 1660-1700. Southern Illinois University Press, 1960.
 White, Arthur Franklin. John Crowne: His Life and Dramatic Works. Routledge,  2019.

1688 plays
West End plays
Tragedy plays
Plays by John Crowne
Darius III